Calisto eleleus is a butterfly of the family Nymphalidae. It is endemic to Hispaniola, where it is found extremely locally in the Cordillera Central.

References

Butterflies described in 1935
Calisto (butterfly)